C128  may refer to:

 Commodore 128, a home / personal computer
 a production designation for the XC-120 Packplane aircraft